Justin Evans (born January 31, 1977) is an American soccer coach and former professional player.

Playing career

Professional 
After graduating from college, Evans signed for the newly formed Pittsburgh Riverhounds in 1999, becoming the team's #1 draft pick and first player.  He also spent time that season in Poland playing in the first division for Petro Płock.  In February 2000, the San Jose Earthquakes selected Evans in the second round of the 2000 MLS SuperDraft.  The Earthquakes released him mid-season and Evans returned to the Riverhounds.  However, he was called up to the Chicago Fire for several games that season. In the Autumn of 2000 Evans moved to Lechia Gdańsk, playing a total of 8 games during his spell. In February 2001, he returned to America when the Fire then drafted Evans in the 2001 MLS SuperDraft.  He played five games for the Fire and one game on loan to the Riverhounds before trading him to the Dallas Burn on July 1, 2001, for future considerations.  Evans signed for the Charleston Battery for the 2002 season, making 29 league appearances. After playing in Poland, Evans re-signed with the Battery for the 2004 and 2005 seasons, making a total of 59 league appearances. Evans re-signed with hometown club Pittsburgh Riverhounds for the 2008 season.

Indoor Soccer 

Evans has also played indoor soccer, playing with the Cleveland Force (2001–2004) and Kansas City Comets between 2004 and 2005. Evans retired from professional soccer at the end of the 2009 season.

Coaching career 

Evans was hired as the head coach of the Pittsburgh Riverhounds on January 11, 2010, and served in that capacity until May 19, 2014.

References 

1974 births
Living people
People from Washington County, Pennsylvania
Soccer players from Pennsylvania
American soccer players
American expatriate sportspeople in Poland
Association football midfielders
Charleston Battery players
Chicago Fire FC players
Chicago Fire FC draft picks
Chicago Storm players
Cleveland Crunch (2001–2002 MISL) players
Cleveland Force (2002–2005 MISL) players
Ekstraklasa players
Expatriate footballers in Poland
FC Dallas players
Kansas City Comets (2001–2005 MISL) players
Major League Soccer players
Northern Virginia Royals players
Pittsburgh Riverhounds SC players
San Jose Earthquakes players
San Jose Earthquakes draft picks
Penn State Nittany Lions men's soccer players
A-League (1995–2004) players
USL First Division players
USL Second Division players
Wisła Płock players
Lechia Gdańsk players
Pittsburgh Riverhounds SC coaches
American expatriate soccer players
American soccer coaches